Sheman: Mistress of the Universe is a 1988 Filipino fantasy adventure comedy film directed by Tony Reyes and starring Joey de Leon as the titular character, alongside Panchito, Ruffa Gutierrez, Dennis Da Silva, Erik Cayetano, Mylene Gonzales, Paquito Diaz, Ruel Vernal, Timmy Cruz, Palito, and Rene Requiestas. It parodies both the film Masters of the Universe and the character Panday as portrayed by Fernando Poe Jr.

Produced by Viva Films, the film was released on September 7, 1988. Critic Lav Diaz gave it a mixed review, praising De Leon's parody of Panday early in the film but expressed disappointment in the lessened comedic quality of later scenes involving Sheman.

Plot 
Pando is a provincial blacksmith who rescues a gay hermit who reveals himself to be a refugee from the Kingdom of Gayskull, which has been usurped by Kiss Manay, who in turn has sent goons into Pando's town to abduct children. To rescue the children and take back Gayskull, the hermit gives Pando the power to transform into Sheman, an effeminate superhero in drag with superhuman abilities and magic weapons. They storm Gayskull, defeat Kiss Manay and rescue the children, after which the Kingdom is transformed back into its original form and the hermit reverts to his former role as prince.

Cast
 Joey de Leon as Pando/Sheman
 Panchito as Tio Paeng
 Ruffa Gutierrez as Tima
 Dennis Da Silva as Lito
 Erik Cayetano as Cris
 Mylene Gonzales
 Paquito Diaz
 Ruel Vernal as Kiss Manay
 Timmy Cruz as Ligaya
 Palito as Skeleton
 Joonee Gamboa as Gayskull
 Atong Redillas
 Rene Requiestas as Stallone
 Yoyong Martirez as Kabo
 Sunshine as Prinsesa Aliksha
 Bamba
 Benjo
 Vic Sotto as the prince
 Tetchie Agbayani as Bubbles
 Jimmy Santos as Joaquin Bordado
 Vangie Labalan
 Alma Lerma as the mother of Ligaya
 Ding Salvador
 Manny Doria
 Carlos Gonzales
 Bomber Moran as Kutchero

Fernando Poe Jr. has an uncredited cameo appearance in the film.

Production
Sheman is actress Timmy Cruz's first film.

Release
Sheman was released on September 7, 1988.

Critical response
Lav Diaz, writing for the Manila Standard, gave the film a mixed review. Though he praised the early comedic scenes of De Leon parodying Panday (as portrayed by Fernando Poe Jr.) through his blacksmith character Pando, Diaz considered the comedic quality to drop as the film progressed and began to involve Sheman, stating that it then creates an "anti-climactic feeling by the end of the film".

See also
 Pandoy: Ang Alalay ng Panday, a 1993 film also starring De Leon which directly parodies the Panday film series

References

External links
 

1988 films
1980s adventure comedy films
1988 comedy films
1988 LGBT-related films
Filipino-language films
Philippine adventure films
Philippine comedy films
Philippine fantasy films
Philippine parody films
Viva Films films